The 2009 NBA playoffs was the postseason tournament of the National Basketball Association's 2008–09 season. The tournament concluded with the Western Conference champion Los Angeles Lakers defeating the Eastern Conference champion Orlando Magic 4 games to 1 in the NBA Finals. Kobe Bryant was named NBA Finals MVP.

Overview
The Portland Trail Blazers made the playoffs for the first time since 2003 and earned home court advantage in a playoff series for the first time since 2000.

The Miami Heat and the Chicago Bulls returned to the playoffs after a one-year absence. They pushed their first round opponents, the Atlanta Hawks and Boston Celtics (respectively) to seven games before losing.

The first round series between the Boston Celtics and Chicago Bulls set an NBA Playoff record for the most overtime games (4) and periods (7) played. However, the Boston Celtics prevailed in seven games.

With their first round win over the Portland Trail Blazers Houston Rockets won a first round series for the first time since 1997, when they last made the conference finals. They pushed the eventual champion Lakers to seven games before losing. The Rockets would not return to the playoffs until 2013.

With their first round win over the Miami Heat, the Atlanta Hawks won a playoff series for the first time since 1999. However, they were swept by the Cleveland Cavaliers in the conference semifinals.

With their first round win over the New Orleans Hornets, the Denver Nuggets won a playoff series for the first time since 1994, when they became the first eighth seed to win a playoff series.

As for the Detroit Pistons and San Antonio Spurs, they failed to advance past the first round for the first time since 2000. The Pistons were swept by the Cleveland Cavaliers, while the Spurs lost to the Dallas Mavericks in a five game upset. The Pistons would not return to the playoffs until 2016, while the Spurs would extract revenge against the Mavericks in next year’s playoffs.

By sweeping the Atlanta Hawks in the Conference Semifinals, the Cleveland Cavaliers became only the second team in NBA History (after the Miami Heat) to go 8–0 through the first two rounds by sweeping the Detroit Pistons and Atlanta Hawks (they would duplicate this feat in 2016, against the same two teams). This was also LeBron James’ last conference finals appearance as a member of the Cleveland Cavaliers until 2015.

With their conference semifinals victory over the Dallas Mavericks, the Denver Nuggets made the conference finals for the first time since 1985. However, they lost to the Los Angeles Lakers in six games, and would not return to the conference finals until 2020.

With their Game 7 road win over the Boston Celtics, the Orlando Magic made the Conference Finals for the first time since 1996. It also marked the first time the Boston Celtics lost a playoff series despite leading 3-2.

With their conference finals victory over the Cleveland Cavaliers, the Orlando Magic made the NBA Finals for the first time since 1995. The Cavaliers would not return to the Conference Finals until 2015.

Game 3 of the NBA Finals marked the first ever finals win for the Orlando Magic. However, they lost to the Los Angeles Lakers in five games.

Game 4 of the NBA Finals marked the first time since 1985 that two overtime games were played in the same NBA Finals series.

With the Lakers’ Game 5 win over the Orlando Magic, Phil Jackson overtook Red Auerbach with the most NBA Championships won by a head coach (10). It also marked the Lakers’ first NBA Finals series win since 2002.

Game 5 of the NBA Finals was also the last NBA Finals game ever played at Amway Arena.

Format

The 3 division winners and 5 other teams with the most wins from each conference qualify for the playoffs. The seedings are based on each team's record; however, a division winner is guaranteed to be ranked at least 4th, regardless of record. All series are in a best-of-7 format with the Games 1–2, 5 and 7 on the home court of the team with the better record, regardless of their seed. For the NBA Finals, the team with the better record plays Games 1–2 and 6–7 at home.

Tiebreak procedures
The tiebreakers that determine seedings are:
Division leader wins tie from team not leading a division
Head-to-head record
Division record (if the teams are in the same division)
Conference record
Record vs. playoff teams, own conference
Record vs. playoff teams, other conference
Point differential, all games

If there are more than 2 teams tied, the team that wins the tiebreaker gets the highest seed, while the other teams are "re-broken" from the first step until all ties are resolved. Since the three division winners are guaranteed a spot in the top 4, ties to determine the division winners must be broken before any other ties.

Playoff qualifying

Eastern Conference

Western Conference

Notes
— = not applicable
 The regular season series was tied 2–2.
 Tie between division leaders was broken first.

Bracket

First round
All times are in Eastern Daylight Time (UTC−4)

Eastern Conference first round

(1) Cleveland Cavaliers vs. (8) Detroit Pistons

This was the third playoff meeting between these two teams, with each team winning one series apiece.

The Cavaliers opened the series with a rout on Game 1, as LeBron James scored 38 points and the Cavaliers won by 18 points. In Game 2, the Cavaliers were leading by 27 points after the third quarter before the Pistons started a comeback in the fourth quarter. The Pistons managed to cut the Cavaliers' lead down to 7 points, but in the end the Cavaliers won the game by 12 points. Game 3 was a tight contest until an 18–2 run by the Cavaliers in the fourth quarter secured the victory for Cleveland. The Cavaliers swept the Pistons with a 21-point victory in Game 4, in which James scored 36 points while narrowly missing a triple-double for two straight games.

(2) Boston Celtics vs. (7) Chicago Bulls

This series has been called the greatest first round series ever, and compared to the greatest series overall.  It featured four overtime games with seven overtime periods, the most ever in a playoff series. The series highlights included future NBA MVP Derrick Rose setting an NBA single game rookie scoring record.  This was the fourth playoff meeting between these two teams, with the Celtics winning the first three meetings.

In Game 1, with the Bulls trailing by 1, rookie Derrick Rose hit 2 free throws with 9.6 seconds left. Celtics captain Paul Pierce had a chance to win the game with his own free throws from a Joakim Noah foul but missed the second, leading to overtime. In the overtime, with Rose fouling out, Tyrus Thomas scored six of the Bulls' eight points to put them up 105–103 with about 50 seconds left. Ray Allen, who had a poor shooting night, had a chance to tie the game and send it into a second overtime but he did not succeed. Even while the playoffs were continuing, many experts and analysts were calling it "the greatest playoff series ever".

Rose matched Kareem Abdul-Jabbar's playoff debut of 36 points to lead the Bulls into a Game 1 road victory. Rose also became the second player to have a 35-point, 10-assist game in their playoff debut in history, after Chris Paul did the feat in 2008; his 36 points was also the highest points scored by a Bull in a playoff game since Michael Jordan retired. The win also marked the Bulls' first postseason win against the Celtics in history.

In Game 2, Ben Gordon poured in 42 points, but lost the duel to Ray Allen. The Bulls were blown out in Game 3. At home in the end of regulation of Game 4, Gordon hit a big bank shot putting the Bulls up 95-93. The Bulls would go on to win in 2OT.

Game 5:

The Bulls held a double digit lead, and Boston came back behind Paul Pierce. Gordon hit a tough shot over Stephon Marbury. Pierce tied with his own jumper, Brad Miller missed 2 free throws with 2 seconds remaining in overtime, and Boston won.

Game 6

The Bulls had to come back from being down 8 in the final 2 minutes of regulation, and did so behind John Salmons. Ray Allen scored 51 points, but the Bulls won in 3OT.

Game 7

The Celtics finished the Bulls off with a 10-point victory.

(3) Orlando Magic vs. (6) Philadelphia 76ers

This was the second playoff meeting between these two teams, with the 76ers winning the first meeting.

In Game 1, the Magic had an 18-point lead in the fourth quarter and Andre Iguodala scored a jumper with 2.2 seconds remaining to give the Sixers a road win over Hedo Türkoğlu. The Sixers almost managed another comeback in Game 2. The Magic led by 18 points midway through the third quarter before another late run by the Sixers brought the lead down to 5 points before the Magic finally won the game. The Sixers won Game 3 courtesy of another late shot; Thaddeus Young scored a layup with 2 seconds left to secure the win, despite a career playoff-high 36-point performance by Dwight Howard. The Magic secured a road win in Game 4 with their own late shot; Türkoğlu scored his own game-winning three-pointer with 1.1 seconds left to even the series.

In Game 5, Dwight Howard had 24 points and a career playoff-high 24 rebounds, leading the Magic to a victory. Game 5 was marked with an elbowing incident by Howard on Samuel Dalembert, which led to a one-game suspension for Howard. Rookie Courtney Lee also went down injured after taking an inadvertent elbow on the head from Howard. Despite losing two starters, Howard and Lee, the Magic won game 6, beating the Sixers on the road by 25 points to win the series.

(4) Atlanta Hawks vs. (5) Miami Heat

This was the second playoff meeting between these two teams, with the Hawks winning the first meeting.

The Hawks opened the series with a 26-point win after leading by as much as 20 points at halftime. The Hawks also tied a franchise record for fewest points allowed in a playoff game. However, the Heat managed to rebound from the loss and won Game 2 on the road to tie the series. The Heat won Game 3 at home, almost in similar fashion as the Hawks' victory in Game 1. The Heat was already leading by 19 points at halftime and ended up winning by 29 points. In the next game, the Hawks bounced back and won a road game to even the series.

Game 5 was marked by several hard fouls and technical fouls. Dwyane Wade was fouled and sent tumbling down by Solomon Jones before a skirmish between Wade, Jones, Jamaal Magloire and Josh Smith started. All four players were given technical fouls in the incident. Wade was later called for a flagrant foul after he fouled Maurice Evans during a layup attempt. The flagrant foul was later rescinded by the officials after they reviewed the play. The Hawks finally won the game, despite losing starting center Al Horford due to injury in the second quarter. The Heat evened the series at 3–3 after winning Game 6. Wade scored 41 points to lead the Heat to a 26-point rout over the Hawks. The Hawks finally won the series after winning Game 7 at home, with 13 points difference. All seven games of the series were decided by at least 10 points, with an average margin of 19 points.

Western Conference first round

(1) Los Angeles Lakers vs. (8) Utah Jazz

This was the fifth playoff meeting between these two teams, with each team winning two series apiece.

(2) Denver Nuggets vs. (7) New Orleans Hornets

This was the first playoff meeting between the Nuggets and the New Orleans Pelicans/Hornets franchise.

The Nuggets routed the Hornets in Game 1, led by hometown player Chauncey Billups's 36 points in his playoff debut for the Nuggets. He sank a career playoff-high 8 three-pointers and added 8 assists in the game. He continued his form in Game 2, scoring 31 points as the Nuggets took a 2–0 lead in the series. The Hornets bounced back with a victory in Game 3. Game 3 was marked with plenty of fouls, with a total of 58 personal fouls in the game, resulting in four players fouling out of the game, David West and Tyson Chandler for the Hornets, and Kenyon Martin and Nenê for the Nuggets. The referees also called three flagrant fouls from James Posey, Chandler and Billups. Hornets' head coach Byron Scott was also called for a technical foul after arguing on Posey's flagrant foul.

The Nuggets then pulled a 58-point win in Game 4. The margin tied the most lopsided victory in playoff history set 53 years ago by the Minneapolis Lakers. The Hornets recorded a playoff-low in points and also a playoff-high 26 turnovers, which led to 41 Nuggets' points. The Nuggets then recorded their first series win since 1994 after a victory in Game 5. Carmelo Anthony scored his career playoff-high with 34 points as the Nuggets cruised to another double-digit win. The average margin of victory in the Nuggets's four wins was 30.75 points.

(3) San Antonio Spurs vs. (6) Dallas Mavericks

This was the fourth playoff meeting between these two teams, with the Spurs winning two of the first three meetings.

(4) Portland Trail Blazers vs. (5) Houston Rockets

Game 2 is Dikembe Mutombo's final NBA game.

This was the third playoff meeting between these two teams, with the Rockets winning the first two meetings.

Conference semifinals

Eastern Conference semifinals

(1) Cleveland Cavaliers vs. (4) Atlanta Hawks

This was the first playoff meeting between the Hawks and the Cavaliers.

(2) Boston Celtics vs. (3) Orlando Magic

This was the first time the Celtics lost a series when leading 3–2.
Game 7 is Stephon Marbury's last NBA game.

This was the second playoff meeting between these two teams, with the Magic winning the first meeting.

Western Conference semifinals

(1) Los Angeles Lakers vs. (5) Houston Rockets

This was the eighth playoff meeting between these two teams, with the Lakers winning four of the first seven meetings.

(2) Denver Nuggets vs. (6) Dallas Mavericks

This was the second playoff meeting between these two teams, with the Mavericks winning the first meeting.

Conference finals

Eastern Conference finals

(1) Cleveland Cavaliers vs. (3) Orlando Magic

This was the first playoff meeting between the Cavaliers and the Magic.

In Game 1, LeBron James dominated with a 49-point performance, while Howard had 30. Early in the game, Howard made a thunderous jam that caused the shot clock to fall backwards. Although James had a potential game-winning three-point play, a furious rally and a game-winning three-pointer by Rashard Lewis allowed the Magic to escape with a victory in game 1. Much like Game 1, Game 2 had the Cavs with an 18-point lead by the second quarter, only for the Magic to rally back in the closing minutes. A jump shot by Hedo Türkoğlu gave the Magic a 2-point lead with 1 second left on the clock, but LeBron James hit a three-pointer to tie the series at the buzzer. In Game 3, the Magic dominated at home, leading to a 10-point victory behind Dwight Howard's 24 points. In Game 4, two clutch free throws by LeBron James sent the game into overtime. While James dominated with 44 (his third 40-point game of the playoffs), an off half-court shot allowed the Magic to escape again with a victory. Down 3–1, James' triple-double allowed his team to stave off elimination in Game 5. After a win in Game 6, the Magic received their second NBA Finals berth in franchise history.

Western Conference finals

(1) Los Angeles Lakers vs. (2) Denver Nuggets

This was the fifth playoff meeting between these two teams, with the Lakers winning the first four meetings.

NBA Finals: (W1) Los Angeles Lakers vs. (E3) Orlando Magic

This was the first playoff meeting between the Lakers and the Magic.

Statistic leader board

References

External links

 Official website of the 2009 NBA Playoffs
 ESPN's NBA page
 2009 NBA Playoffs at Basketball Reference

Playoffs
National Basketball Association playoffs
Sports in Portland, Oregon

fi:NBA-kausi 2008–2009#Pudotuspelit